Johnathon Schaech (born September 10, 1969) is an American actor and screenwriter. He has been working as an actor since the early 1990s.

Early life 
Johnathon Schaech was born in Edgewood, Maryland, in 1969 to Joe, a Baltimore City law enforcement officer, and Joanne Schaech, a human resources executive. He is Catholic. He has a sister, Renée. 

Schaech graduated from the University of Maryland, Baltimore County, where he studied economics and took one acting class.

Career 
In 1989, Schaech signed with Wilhelmina West and worked for three years doing commercials and bit parts in movies. He studied under acting teacher Roy London for three and half years until London's death in 1993.

1991–2000 
In 1993, Schaech played the lead role in Franco Zeffirelli's period drama Sparrow. Schaech then played drifter Xavier Red in the Gregg Araki film The Doom Generation. In 1995, Schaech's character Leon romanced Winona Ryder's character Finn in How to Make an American Quilt which received a nomination for the Screen Actors Guild Award for Outstanding Performance by a Cast in a Motion Picture. In 1996, Schaech played the ambitious but self-absorbed lead singer of The Wonders in Tom Hanks' That Thing You Do! Schaech next starred opposite Jessica Lange and Gwyneth Paltrow  in the 1998 thriller Hush, which "promptly bombed".

Also in 1996, he was on the cover of Vanity Fair's annual "Hollywood" issue.

In 1997, Schaech starred in the Australian comedy Welcome to Woop Woop directed by Stephan Elliott. Playing a British military man, Schaech was in the independent feature Woundings in 1998, for which he won Best Supporting Actor at the 2001 New York International Independent Film & Video Festival. In 1998, Schaech portrayed Harry Houdini in TNT's Houdini. Schaech received praise not only for a convincing dramatic portrayal, but for learning and performing all the magic tricks and stunts himself. In 1999, Schaech appeared with Harvey Keitel in Finding Graceland and in 1999, Schaech reunited with Araki in Splendor, which premiered at the 1999 Sundance Film Festival. In 1999, he played the love interest of Jennifer Love Hewitt in the Party of Five spin-off, Time of Your Life. In 2000, Schaech performed in his first major play, David Rabe's A Question for Mercy, playing a Colombian-born gay Manhattanite dying of AIDS. He lost  for the role. In 2000, Schaech played a small part in the comedy How To Kill Your Neighbor's Dog.

2001–2010 
In 2001, Schaech played the title character in the ABC television film Judas. In 2002, he played Seattle cop and detective named Daniel Pruitt in the movie Blood Crime. In 2005, he co-starred with his then-wife Christina Applegate, in Suzanne's Diary for Nicholas for CBS.  In 2006, Schaech starred in Little Chenier. The film won best picture and best ensemble at the Phoenix film festival. In 2006, he co-starred opposite Heather Locklear in the Lifetime television film Angels Fall. In 2007, Schaech was nominated for an MTV award for best villain for his performance in Sony's remake of Prom Night. In 2009, Schaech played Captain Rezo Avaliani in the Renny Harlin directed war film 5 Days of War. In 2009, Schaech guest starred in a Cold Case, playing Julian Bellows, a good man who kept a dark secret.

2011–present 
In 2013, Schaech played a Soviet political officer, in the submarine thriller Phantom. He appeared in five episodes of the first season of the Showtime series Ray Donovan as an eccentric movie star, Sean Walker, and played the Egyptian mercenary Tarak in The Legend of Hercules, gaining  of muscle for the role. In 2014, Schaech played Colonel Sherman in the miniseries Texas Rising. Between 2016 and 2018, Schaech appeared in the first three seasons of the television series Legends of Tomorrow as the DC Comics bounty hunter Jonah Hex. He returned in 2019 to reprise the role in the crossover event Crisis on Infinite Earths. In 2016, Schaech shot the heist movie Marauders, playing a possibly corrupt cop whose wife is dying of cancer. The film would make it to Netflix's U.S. platform's top two in December 2020. In 2018, Schaech appeared in noir crime drama The Night Clerk opposite Ana de Armas. In 2018, Schaech starred opposite Frank Grillo in the action flick Reprisal. Years after its release, the film made Netflix's US platform's top five in October 2021.

Writing 
Schaech has co-written several screenplays with Richard Chizmar, including Heroes (2002), Road House 2 (Sony Pictures Home Entertainment, 2006), based on a story by Miles Chapman, Masters of Horror The Washingtonians (Showtime, 2007), based on a story by Bentley Little and The Poker Club, based on the story by Ed Gorman. They have also co-written screenplays based on stories by Peter Crowther (Fear Itself: Eater, NBC/AXN Sci-Fi, 2009), Lewis Shiner (Fear Itself: The Circle, NBC/AXN Sci-Fi, 2009) and Stephen King (From A Buick 8 and Black House, both in production 2009).

Schaech's book, Rick Dempsey's Caught Stealing: Unbelievable Stories From a Lifetime of Baseball, was published in 2014.

Personal life 
During the mid-1990s, Schaech often accompanied actress Ellen DeGeneres, who had not yet come out as a lesbian, to public events. Schaech was scheduled to appear in the 1997 episode of Ellen in which DeGeneres's character also came out as gay but could not participate in the filming.

Schaech married actress Christina Applegate in October 2001. In December 2005, he filed for a divorce citing irreconcilable differences, which became final in August 2007.

Schaech's next marriage was to Jana Kramer on July 4, 2010, after announcing their engagement the previous December, but announced their separation one month later. Their divorce was finalized in June 2011.

In 2013, Schaech spoke on Capitol Hill about the importance of arts education.

Schaech's third marriage was to Julie Solomon, in July 2013. They have a son born in September 2013, and a daughter born in July 2020.

On January 11, 2018, Schaech wrote an article in People Magazine, in which he stated that director Franco Zeffirelli sexually assaulted him during the filming of Sparrow (1993). Schaech wrote that the assault dented his confidence and caused trauma that led to his addictions to sex, drugs, and alcohol.

In 2019, Schaech took part in the Rape, Abuse & Incest National Network (RAINN) PSA, "Won't Stay Quiet" as a survivor of sexual violence.

Filmography

Film

Television

References

External links 

 

1969 births
Living people
20th-century American male actors
21st-century American male actors
Male actors from Maryland
American male film actors
American male television actors
American television writers
American male television writers
People from Edgewood, Maryland
University of Maryland, Baltimore County alumni
American people of German descent
American writers of Italian descent
Catholics from Maryland
Screenwriters from Maryland